May Township is a township in Cass County, Minnesota, United States.  The population was 730 at the 2000 census. May Township was named for May Griffith, the daughter of a county official.

Geography
According to the United States Census Bureau, the township has a total area of 60.6 square miles (156.9 km2), of which 60.0 square miles (155.3 km2) is land and 0.6 square mile (1.6 km2) (0.99%) is water.

The city of Motley is located entirely within May Township geographically but is a separate entity.

Unincorporated communities
 Bridgeman
 Casino

Major highways
  Minnesota State Highway 64
  Minnesota State Highway 210

Lakes
 Doe Lake
 Fucat Lake
 Horseshoe Lake
 Solarz Lake

Adjacent townships
 Meadow Brook Township (north)
 Home Brook Township (northeast)
 Fairview Township (east)
 Sylvan Township (east)
 Rosing Township, Morrison County (southeast)
 Motley Township, Morrison County (south)
 Villard Township, Todd County (southwest)
 Becker Township (west)
 Byron Township (northwest)

Cemeteries
The township contains Bridgeman Cemetery.

Demographics
As of the census of 2000, there were 730 people, 265 households, and 205 families residing in the township.  The population density was 12.2 people per square mile (4.7/km2).  There were 330 housing units at an average density of 5.5/sq mi (2.1/km2).  The racial makeup of the township was 97.95% White, 0.96% Native American, 0.27% Asian, 0.14% from other races, and 0.68% from two or more races. Hispanic or Latino of any race were 1.51% of the population.

There were 265 households, out of which 35.5% had children under the age of 18 living with them, 68.3% were married couples living together, 4.5% had a female householder with no husband present, and 22.3% were non-families. 17.0% of all households were made up of individuals, and 5.3% had someone living alone who was 65 years of age or older.  The average household size was 2.75 and the average family size was 3.13.

In the township the population was spread out, with 28.5% under the age of 18, 9.0% from 18 to 24, 25.9% from 25 to 44, 24.9% from 45 to 64, and 11.6% who were 65 years of age or older.  The median age was 38 years. For every 100 females, there were 105.6 males.  For every 100 females age 18 and over, there were 112.2 males.

The median income for a household in the township was $36,875, and the median income for a family was $40,227. Males had a median income of $26,146 versus $19,063 for females. The per capita income for the township was $14,854.  About 6.8% of families and 7.2% of the population were below the poverty line, including 6.6% of those under age 18 and 5.7% of those age 65 or over.

References
 United States National Atlas
 United States Census Bureau 2007 TIGER/Line Shapefiles
 United States Board on Geographic Names (GNIS)

Townships in Cass County, Minnesota
Brainerd, Minnesota micropolitan area
Townships in Minnesota